Frisian handball is a traditional Frisian sport, related to American handball and fives, that is most commonly practiced by people from the northern Dutch province of Friesland (Fryslân). It is believed to be one of the oldest ballgames and was an unofficial demonstration sport at the 1928 Summer Olympics in Amsterdam. The scoring is similar to tennis. The first team scoring six games wins the match.

Rules
The major Frisian handball tournament, called the P.C. (short for Permanent Committee), has been held in the city of Franeker since 1854 and is considered the oldest regular sports tournament in the world.

Frisian handball is played on a rectangular lawn of 10 meters by 32 meters, by two teams composed of 3 players. In the center of one short side of the field is a receiving zone of 5 meters by 19 meters defended by 2 players, the other team member remaining field player. One of the opponents serves the hard leather ball with his bare hand from a serving box at about 30 meters from the receiving zone. If he does not succeed in reaching the receiving zone, the receiving team gets a direct score. When the receiving team, of which the players are allowed to wear a single hardened leather glove, returns the ball over the short line behind the serving box (called the upper line, in West Frisian boppe) they also get a direct score. Of course, the serving team is allowed to prevent this happening by hitting or holding the ball before the upper line. The place where the ball remains after such a rally is marked with a small woodblock called a kaats, which is best defined as an undecided score. When two such undecided points occur (or one, if one of the teams is on game point) the teams change places.
In the next rally, the team that then has the receiving position, tries to hit the ball past the first kaats and, if any, in the next rally past the second kaats, so deciding the undecided points. Then they start all over again.

In parts of Belgium, the similar game of jeu de balle-pelote is played. This game is played by teams of 5 players on a trapezium shaped field, mostly located on marketplaces.

See also 
 Handball International Championships
 International game

External links 

 KNKB Dutch Federation
 Franeker's Permanent Committee
 Ath Handball Museum 
 1956, Balle Pelote final match, Braine-Gosseli

 
Ball games
Team sports
Sport in Friesland
Sports originating in the Netherlands